Ernest Gadsden (22 December 1895–1966) was an English footballer who played in the Football League for Blackpool, Halifax Town and Norwich City.

References

1895 births
1979 deaths
English footballers
Association football defenders
English Football League players
Norwich City F.C. players
Shildon A.F.C. players
Portsmouth F.C. players
Blackpool F.C. players
Halifax Town A.F.C. players